Lee Eun (born July 10, 1961) is a director and producer of films in South Korea.

Filmography
As director
The Night Before Strike (1990)
If the Sun Rises in the West (1998)
Oh! Land of Dream (1989)

As producer
Hello, Brother (2005)
Wet Dreams 2 (2005)
Desire (2002)
Joint Security Area (2000)
The Isle (1999)
Contact (1997)
The Night Before of Strike (1990)

References 

1961 births
Living people
South Korean film directors